This is a list of current and former Roman Catholic churches in the Roman Catholic Archdiocese of Detroit. The Detroit Archdiocese is divided into four administrative regions: Central (City of Detroit); Northeast (including Macomb and St. Clair Counties), Northwest (including Oakand and Lapeer Counties), and South (including Monroe County and southern and western Wayne County). Each of the four regions is further divided into smaller administrative areas known as vicariates.

Central Region

Genesis Vicariate

Renaissance Vicariate

Southwest Vicariate

Trinity Vicariate

Northeast Region

Blue Water Vicariate 
The Blue Water Vicariate consists of nine parishes in the St. Clair County communities of Ira Township, Lakeport, Marine City, New Baltimore, Port Huron, Marysville, Memphis, Richmond, and St. Clair.

Central Macomb Vicariate 
The Central Macomb Vicariate consists of 23 parishes in the Macomb County communities of Center Line, Clinton Township, Harrison Township, Mount Clemens, Sterling Heights, and Warren.

North Macomb Vicariate

SERF Vicariate 
The SERF Vicariate consists of the southeastern section of the Northeast Region and includes the Macomb County communities of Eastpointe, Grosse Pointe Farms, Grosse Pointe Park, Grosse Pointe Woods, Roseville, and St. Clair Shores.

Northwest Region

Lakes Vicariate

Pontiac Vicariate

South Oakland Vicariate 
The South Oakland Vicariate is part of the Northwest Region of the Archdiocese of Detroit and includes 24 parishes in the Oakland County communities of Berkley, Beverly Hills, Birmingham, Bloomfield Hills, Clawson, Farmington, Farmington Hills, Hazel Park, Madison Heights, Northville, Oak Park, Royal Oak, Southfield, and Troy.

Thumb Vicariate 

The Thumb Vicariate is part of the Northwest Region of the Archdiocese of Detroit and includes 10 parishes or missions in the Lapeer and western St. Clair County communities of Allenton, Brown City, Capac, Dryden, Emmett, Imlay City, Lapeer, North Branch, and Yale.

South Region

Downriver Vicariate 
The Downriver Vicariate is part of the South Region of the Archdiocese of Detroit and is made up of 17 parishes in the Downriver Wayne County communities of Allen Park, Ecorse, Flat Rock, Grosse Ile, Lincoln Park, Melvindale, Riverview, Southgate, Taylor, Trenton, Woodhaven, and Wyandotte.

Monroe Vicariate

Northwest Wayne Vicariate 
The Northwest Wayne Vicariate is part of the South Region of the Archdiocese of Detroit and is made up of 18 parishes in the communities of Canton, Dearborn, Dearborn Heights, Garden City, Livonia, Novi, Northville, Novi, Plymouth, South Lyon, and Westland.

West Wayne Vicariate 
The West Wayne Vicariate is part of the South Region of the Archdiocese of Detroit and is made up of 18 parishes in the Wayne County communities of Belleville, Dearborn, Dearborn Heights, New Boston, Romulus, Wayne, and Westland.

Former churches and other buildings

References

 
Detroit
Detroit-related lists